Goseong ogwangdae is a Korean traditional masked dance performance which was selected as the seventh Important Intangible Cultural Property number 7 on 24 December 1964, following Tongyeong ogwandae. The tradition is handed down and performed in Goseong, Gyeongsangnam-do, South Korea.

History
Its origin and the transmission path are unknown but according to the performance holder, person in Masan province succeeded it to others in early 1900s. Its original content is changed gradually, but Goseong ogwangdae has the most youngnam province style because of its characteristic of lines, masks, costume, dance kept its origin the most. It was forbiddened during the Japanese colonial era, but it came back after the independence. the performance shows the life of ordinary people and satirizing the landed gentry and ridiculing the problem of wives. It was played in the 15th day of the New Year according to the lunar calendar in the past, but today the performance usually played in Spring and autumn. Unlike the other five story traditional mask playing, Goseong ogwangdae has no ceremony exorcising evil spirits before and after the performance instead it is more entertainment.

Procedures
is organized with five stories and the dancing is mainly  yeombul-taryeong, gutguri called dutbaegi, which is a traditional dance style of youngnam province.ogwandae's dancing is called dutbegi and malttuki's dancing was active as sword dance but it became more calmly. Usually people played at the mountain in Goseong together. The mask is made with wood and the performance was made on a 5-6 layers of straw mat. On one side, musicians were seated. Its story is similar to Tongyeong ogwandae. The first story is about mundung bukchum. mundung come out with instrument and dance with lamentation. He says that his incurable illness is due to his ancestors. The second story is about ohgwandae . malttuki comes out and ridicules 7 noblemen and argues that he is the only noble. The third story is about bibi. Bibi is a monster who has a human face and the monster body. The fourth story is about monk. A monk dances for jaejagaksi and thrown out by the grandmother. The last story is about jemilju. An old man mets his wife during affair with other women. the story is satiring a concubine system.

Transmission
Lee yun-hee and Jung-hwakung were the masters of the performance and they tried to hand it down to 15 to 16 youngs. Kim chang-hu, Chun se-bong, Bae gab-mun, Hong ik-su, Nam sang-gik, Choi eung-du, Heo pan-se were designated by the inganmunhwa je and currently Lee yun-sun is designated to a holder.

References

 Korean Cultural Heritage Administration
 Korean Culture Information Service

Masked dances
Korean culture
Important Intangible Cultural Properties of South Korea
Korean games
South Gyeongsang Province